Buzanjan-e Olya (also Romanized as Būzanjān-e ‘Olyā; also known as Būzanjān) is a village in Beyza Rural District, Beyza District, Sepidan County, Fars Province, Iran. At the 2006 census, its population was 105, in 29 families.

References 

Populated places in Beyza County